The Gondi (Gōndi) or Gond or Koitur are a Dravidian speaking ethnolinguistic group in India. They are spread over the states of Madhya Pradesh, Maharashtra, Chhattisgarh, Uttar Pradesh, Telangana, Andhra Pradesh, Bihar, Assam, Arunachal Pradesh, Uttarakhand and Odisha.

The Gond have formed many kingdoms of historical significance. Gondwana Kingdom was the ruling kingdom in Gondwana region of India. The Gondwana region includes core region of eastern part of the Vidarbha of Maharashtra, Garha Kingdom the parts of Madhya Pradesh immediately to the north of it, and parts of the west of Chhattisgarh. The wider region extends beyond these, also including parts of northern Telangana, western Odisha and southern Uttar Pradesh.

The Gondwana Kingdom was ruled by Rajgonds. The Rajgonds are the ruling class among the Gond. The Gond is the dominating Community in Gondwana region. The name Gondwana named after Gondi people. They are also known as thakur.

A Dravidian language, Gondi is claimed to be related to the Telugu. The 2011 Census of India recorded about 2.98 million Gondi-speakers. They are concentrated in southeastern Madhya Pradesh, eastern Maharashtra, southern Chhattisgarh and northern Telangana. Many Gonds, however, speak later regionally-dominant languages like Hindi, Marathi, Odia and Telugu.

According to the 1971 census, their population was 5.01 million. By the 1991 census, this had increased to 9.3 million and by the 2001 census the figure was nearly 11 million. For the past few decades, they have seen the Naxalite–Maoist insurgency in the central part of India. Gondi people, at the behest of the Chhattisgarh government, formed the Salwa Judum, an armed militant group to fight the Naxalite insurgency; But Salwa Judum was disbanded by order of Supreme court on 5 July 2011.

Etymology 
The origin of the name 'Gond', used by outsiders, is still uncertain. Some believe the word to derive from konda, meaning hill, in a similar manner to the Khonds of Odisha. The Gonds call themselves Koitur, which colonial scholars thought related to the Khond self-designation Kui in the same way.

History
The origins of the Gonds are still in debate. Some have claimed that the Gonds were a collection of disparate tribes that adopted a proto-Gondi language as a mother tongue from a class of rulers, originally speaking various pre-Dravidian languages. Genetic evidence notes extensive gene flow between the Gonds and Munda peoples to the east, but rules out a common origin, instead noting the Gonds and Munda peoples have distinct origins.

R. V. Russell believed the Gonds came into Gondwana from the south: up the Godavari into Vidarbha, and from there they moved up the Indravati into Bastar and up the Wardha and Wainganga into the Satpura Range.

The first historical reference from the Gonds comes from Muslim writers in the 14th century. Scholars believe that Gonds ruled in Gondwana, a region extending from what is now eastern Madhya Pradesh to western Odisha and from northern Andhra Pradesh to the southeastern corner of Uttar Pradesh, between the 13th and 19th centuries CE.

The first kingdom of the Gonds was that of Chanda, founded in 1200, although some genealogies trace its founders to the 9th century CE. The Gonds of Chanda originated from Sirpur in what is now northern Telangana and were said to have overthrown the previous rulers of the country, called the Mana dynasty. Another theory states that after the downfall of the Kakatiyas in 1318, the Gonds of Sirpur had the opportunity to throw off outside domination and built their own kingdom. The kingdom of Chanda developed extensive irrigation and the first defined revenue system of the Gond kingdoms. It also began the first Gond kingdom to built forts, which later became highly sophisticated. Khandakhya Ballal Shah founded the town of Chandrapur and shifted the capital there from Sirpur. The Ain-i-Akbari records the kingdom as being fully independent, and it even conquered some territory from nearby sultanates. However, during Akbar's rule, Babji Shah began paying tribute after the Mughals incorporated territory to their south into the Berar Subah.

The kingdom of Garha was founded in the 14th century by Jadurai who deposed the previous Kalachuri rulers. Garha-Mandla is known for queen Rani Durgavati, who fought against Mughal emperor Akbar (d. 1564). Mandla was then ruled by her son Bir Narayan, similarly fought until he died. Afterward his kingdom was offered to Chanda Shah by the victorious Mughals. During Shah Jahan's reign, his successor Hirde Shah was attacked by the Bundelas and shifted the capital to Mandla. His successors fought against themselves and invited the aid of Aurangzeb and the Marathas to help their cause.

Deogarh was founded in the early 13th century. It is said  that the founded, Jatba, slew the previous Gauli rulers during a temple festival. In the Ain-i-Akbari, Deogarh was said to have 2000 cavalry, 50,000 footmen and 100 elephants and was ruled by a monarch named Jatba. Jatba built outposts in the Berar plains, including a fort near modern Nagpur. It was his grandson Bakr Shah who, in order to enlist Aurangzeb's help, converted to Islam and became Bakht Buland Shah. Shah founded the city of Nagpur and brought a revival of the fortunes of Deogarh kingdom. During his reign, the kingdom covered the southeastern Satpura range from Betul to Rajnandgaon in the east, and parts of the northern Berar plains. Under his son Chand Sultan, Nagpur gained even more importance.

These kingdoms were briefly conquered by the Mughals, but eventually, the Gond rajas were restored and were simply under Mughal suzerainty. In the 1740s, the Marathas began to attack the Gond rajas, causing both rajas and subjects to flee from the plains to the refugees in the forests and hills. Raghoji Bhonsle forced the Gond rajas of Garha-Mandla to pay tribute to him. Marathi caste groups quickly replaced the displaced original population. Maratha occupation of the Gond rajas' territory continued until the Third Anglo-Maratha War, when the British took control over the remaining Gond zamindaris and took over revenue collection. The British, who regarded the Gonds as "plunderers" and "thieves" before their takeover, changed their attitude so they saw the Gonds as "timid" and "meek by the mid-19th century. The remaining Gond zamindaris were absorbed into the Indian Union upon independence.

During colonial rule, the Gonds were marginalized by colonial forest management practices. The Bastar rebellion of 1910, better known in the tribal belt as the bhumkal, was a partly-successful armed struggle against colonial forest policy that denied the Madia and Muria Gonds of Bastar, along with other tribes in the region, access to the forest for their livelihoods. In the early 1920s, Komaram Bheem, a Gond leader from Adilabad in Hyderabad state, rebelled against the Nizam and sought a separate Gond raj. It was he who coined the well-known slogan jal, jangal, jameen ("water, forest, land") that has symbolized Adivasi movements since independence.

In 1916, Gondi intellectuals from various parts of Gondwana formed the Gond Mahasabha to protect Gondi culture from increasing outside influence. The Gond Mahasabha held meetings in 1931 and 1934 to discuss ways to preserve Gond culture from manipulation by outsiders, social norms the Gonds should have, and solidarity between the Gonds of different parts of Gondwana. Starting in the 1940s, various Gond leaders agitated for a separate Gondwana state that encompassed the erstwhile territory of Gondwana: especially tribal areas of eastern Madhya Pradesh and Chhattisgarh, Vidharbha and Adilabad. The demand reached its peak in the early 1950s when Heera Singh founded the Bharatiya Gondwana Sangh to agitate for statehood. Singh held many meetings throughout Gondwana and could mobilize 1 lakh people at his height in 1962–1963, but his movement had died down by the late 1960s and was never taken seriously by the Indian authorities. Other methods of agitation, including petitions and demands by various Gond organisations, were ignored by the state. In the 1990s, Heera Singh Markam and Kausalya Porte founded the Gondwana Ganatantra Party to fight for statehood.

Based on ethnographic fieldwork and oral narratives and history, as per the Gond myth, there are three kinds of Gonds - the Sur Gonds, the Nand Gonds and the Raj Gonds. The Raj Gonds descend from the elder sister hence they are the eldest in the hierarchy of their clans. The Raj Gonds are well educated, have landholdings, and are wealthier than the other Gonds.

The Gond rajas used Singh or Shah as titles, influenced by the Rajputs and Mughals. The Gond are also known as the Raj Gond. The term was widely used in the 1950s, but has now become almost obsolete, probably because of the political eclipse of the Gond rajas.

Society 
The Gond society is divided into several exogamous patrilineal units known as sagas. The number depends on the region: with Gonds in the hills of Madhya Pradesh and the northern Nagpur plain having only two and tho the southern Nagpur plain and Adilabad having four. In Adilabad, these sagas are called Yerwen, Sarwen, Siwen and Nalwen, whose names refer to the number of ancestors for that saga. In Adilabad there is a fifth saga: Sarpe saga, which for marriage purposes is linked with Sarwen although their origin myths are different. According to Gond mythology, each saga once lived in a single village but soon moved out and established their own villages. The names of these ancestral villages are preserved in culture and sometimes identified with present-day locations. The number of ancestors for each saga is a symbol of the saga, and on many ceremonial and ritual occasions the number of involved animals, people, actions or objects corresponds to that saga's number.

The saga exists mostly in the sphere of ritual and has no real political or organizational significance. The most visible sign of saga consciousness is in the worship of Persa Pen, although this worship is mainly at the clan level. All worshippers of the same Persa pen see themselves as agnatically related and so any intermarriage or sexual relations between them is forbidden. Gonds use the term soira to refer to sagas whose members they can marry.

Each saga is regarded as performing actions essential to society as a whole. During ceremonies and ritual events, the saga becomes important for determining roles in the proceedings. For instance, in the worship of a clan's Persa pen, the clan priest is involved in sacrifice while two members of a soira saga to the celebrating clan dress the idol and cook the sacrificial food. During certain parts of Gond festivals, participants divide into saga or soira. And for serving the sacrificial meal at Persa Pen, members of each saga seat separately and are served in order of which their ancestors emerged from the cave in their origin story. However all saga have equal status in Gond society. Members of each saga work cooperatively in issues affecting their relationship with other sagas, such as negotiations about bride price in marriage. In addition, for ritual purposes, any person can be replaced by a person from the same age, generation and saga. So for instance in a marriage where for instance the brides' parents are not present, a couple from the same saga as the bride can stand in for the bride's parents in the ritual. This applies also to the relations between Gonds and Pardhans: if a Pardhan of the same clan is not found, then a Pardhan belonging to a different clan in the same saga can be brought in as a suitable replacement.

Subdivided in the saga is the pari, or clan, the main unit of organisation of Gond society. In each saga the number of clans is determined by the number of ancestors of that saga. The clans of a saga are arranged by precedence in when they emerged from the cave in the Gond creation story. This precedence regulates behaviour during some rituals, for instance during the First Fruit festival, all members of a saga eat at the seniormost member of the seniormost pari of the saga represented in the village. Group relations between senior and junior pari are based on relations between older and younger brothers. For instance, members of a senior pari cannot marry a widow from a junior pari, since it is seen as analogous to the marriage between an elder brother and a younger brother's wife. Clans generally have names relating to specific plants. Some common pari include Tekam, Uikey, Markam, Dhurwe and Atram.

Each clan is divided into several parallel lineages called kita. Each of these kita has a specific ritual function within Gond society: for instance the katora kita is the only kita which presides over the worship of Persa Pen. Kita in some clans use Maratha titles like Deshmukh, bestowed on certain Gond chiefs. The kita functions only in the ritual sphere. Sometimes the clans are also divided into khandan, or subclans, which are generally organic in nature. Each khandan is like a mini-clan, in that it has its own set of ritual objects for worship of Persa Pen, and is formed when a group in a pari including a katora decide to set up a new centre for worship of Persa Pen. Eventually this group becomes solidified into a khandan.

Culture
Many astronomical ideas were known to ancient Gonds. Gonds had their own local terms for the Sun, Moon, Milky Way, and constellations. Most of these ideas were basis for their time-keeping and calendrical activities.

The Gondi language is spoken by almost 30 lakh Gonds: mainly in the southern area of their range. This area encompasses the southeastern districts of Madhya Pradesh, eastern Maharashtra, northern Telganana, and southern Chhattisgarh (mainly in Bastar division). The language is related to Telugu. In the early 20th century, the language was spoken by 15 lakhs: around half their population at the time, the rest have shifted to other regional languages. Then also almost the entire population was bilingual. At present, the language is only spoken by one fifth of Gonds and is dying out even in its traditional linguistic range.

In Chhattisgarh, women perform the sua dance, which was named after the word for "parrot". It is performed after Diwali to honour Shiva and Parvati, representing the belief that the parrot will bring their sadness to their lovers.

The Gondi people have their own version of the Ramayana known as the Gond Ramayani, derived from oral folk legends. It consists of seven stories with Lakshmana as the protagonist, set after the main events of the Ramayana, where he finds a bride.

Religion
The majority of Gond people still follow their own traditions of nature worship, but like many other tribes in India, their religion has been affected by Brahminical Hinduism.

Most Gondi people either practice Brahminical Hinduism, or their own indigenous religion, Koyapunem.

Some Gonds also practice Sarnaism. Pola, a cattle festival, Phag, and Dassera are some of their major festivals. A small amount of Gonds are Christians or Muslims.

Hinduism

In medieval times, the Gondi kingdoms worshipped Vishnu as their patron deity.

The Gonds worship ancestral deities known as Angadevs , which Brahminical Hindus claim is a representation of their goddess Mahakali. There were seven groups of Angadevs, organised by numbers up to seven, and rescued by Pari Kupar Lingo from the Kachchargardh caves. In one version, there were twenty-eight Angadevs, and in another version, there were thirty-three Angadevs (or Saga Deva).

In the other version, the Angadevs or Saga Deva were the children of the goddess Mata Kali Kankali, after she ate a flower given to her by a sage. They were raised in Raitad Jungo's ashram, and while they were playing, they met the gods Shambu and Gaura. Gaura offered them food, but because they were annoyed by the children's mischief, Shambu and Gaura imprisoned them in the Kachchargardh caves. For twelve years, the children relied on a pond and a mythical bird who provided them food to survive. Kali Kankali pleaded to Shambu to release her children, but he rejected her pleas. Raitad Jungo then asked Pari Kupar Lingo to help him free the children, and Pari Kupar Lingo approached the bard Hirasuka Patalir. Patalir played music on his kingri, and the children were filled with strength to push the boulder blocking the caves from the outside world. Patalir was then crushed by the boulder. Ever since, the Kachchargardh caves became a site of pilgrimage, and Kali Kankali became one of the dharmagurus of the Gondi people.

Their typical reaction to death has been described as one of anger, because Gonds believe death is caused magically, by demons. Gonds usually bury their dead, but due to partial Hinduization, their kings occasionally cremated as per Vedic practices. Hinduization has led to cremation become more common. With a person were buried their worldly possessions. According to Gond mythology, the dead have an interest in the future of the living, and so the dead are placated so that the living remain prosperous. For the deceased with unnatural death, the ancestors will invite them to join them as a sacred domestic spirit. Otherwise, they might become an evil spirit.

Koyapunem

The name of the native Gond religion is Koyapunem (meaning "the way of nature"), which was founded by Pari Kupar Lingo. It is also known as Gondi Punem, or "the way of the Gondi people".

In Gond folk tradition, adherents worship a high god known as Baradeo, whose alternate names are Bhagavan, Kupar Lingo, Badadeo, and Persa Pen. Baradeo oversees activities of lesser gods such as clan and village deities, as well as ancestors. Baradeo is respected but he does not receive fervent devotion, which is shown only to clan and village deities, ancestors, and totems. Before any festival occurs these two deities are worshipped. Each clan has their own , meaning "great god." This god is benign at heart but can display violent tendencies.

Three people are important in Gond religious ceremonies: the baiga (village priest), the bhumka (clan priest), and the kaser-gaita (leader of the village).

As Kupar Lingo, the high god of the Gonds is depicted as a clean-shaven young prince wearing a trident-shaped crown, the munshul, which represents the head, heart, and body. There are many shrines to Kupar Lingo in Gondwana, as he is revered as an ancestral hero.

As per Gond religious beliefs, their ancestor Rupolang Pahandi Pari Kupar Lingo was born as the son of the chief Pulsheev, during the reign of Sambhu-Gaura several thousand years ago. Kupar Lingo became the ruler of the Koya race and established the Gondi Punem, a code of conduct and philosophy that the Gondi practice. He gathered thirty-three disciples to teach the Gondi Punem to the distant lands of the koyamooree.

A principle in the Gond religion is munjok, which is non-violence, cooperation, and self-defense. Another part of Gond belief is salla and gangra, which represent action and reaction, superficially similar to the concept of karma in Hinduism. To prevent people from destroying themselves in conflict and discord, they are supposed to live under the Phratrial society. Among the beliefs for the Phratrial society include the need to defend the community from enemies, working together and being in harmony with nature, and being allowed to eat animals (but not the animal representing a totem).

Like village deity worship in South India, Gonds believe their clan and village deities have the capability of possession. The person being possessed by the spirit ceases to have any responsibility for their actions. Gonds also believe disease is caused by spirit possession.

Many Gonds worship Ravana, whom they consider to be the tenth  of their people, the ancestor-king of one of their four lineages, and the eightieth lingo (great teacher). They also worship Kupar Lingo as their supreme deity and their ancestor before Ravana. On Dussehra, the Gondi inhabitants of Paraswadi in Gadchiroli district carry an image of Ravana riding an elephant in a procession to worship him and protest the burning of Ravana's effigies.

The Gonds venerate plants and animals, especially the Saja tree. When there is no specific shrine for the village mother goddess, the saja tree is her abode. In addition, the Penkara, or holy circle of the clan, is under this tree. Gonds in Seoni believe Baradeo lives in a saja tree. The Mahua plant, whose flowers produce a liquor considered purifying, is also revered. In many Gond weddings, the bride and groom circle a post made out of a Mahua tree during the ceremony, and the Gonds of Adilabad perform the first ceremonies of the year when Mahua flowers bloom.

Gonds also believe in rain gods. One early British anthropologist noted how during the pre-Monsoon hunting ceremony, the amount of blood spilled by the animals was indicative of the amount of rain to follow.

The gods are known as pen in the singular, and pennoo in the plural. Other gods worshipped by the Gonds include:

 Mata Kali Kankali, the ancestral mother of the Gondi forefathers. She is associated with Mahakali.
 Dulha-Pen, the bridegroom god. He is represented by a stone, a man riding a horse, or a battle-axe.
 Gansam, the protector of villages from tigers. He is represented by a stone on the village boundary or a platform and a pole. Animals were sacrificed to him.
 Hardul, the god of weddings ones upon a time a king named veer Singh bundela of orchha went Delhi to meet Jahangir mugal emperor then he returned and Suspected his wife that his wife has made relations with his younger brother Hardaul, on this his queen expressed grief, then the king asked Hardaul to feed poisoned kheer. then hardaul drank it
After the death of Hardaul, the king's sister was very angry with him, after many years when she got married, she came to invite him to the wedding, but the king refused her. He invited Hardaul's funeral pyre and Hardaul's presence was observed in the marriage Since then, gond community and Bundeli people invite Hardaul in Orchha before marriage..
 .
 Bhimsen or Bhimal, the god of strength and the earth. He is associated with rocks, mountains, and rivers, and certain hills and rocks are considered holy sites of Bhimsen.
 Nat Awal or Dharti Mata, the goddess of fertility.
 Bhumi, the earth and the mother of humanity.
 Nat Auwal, the mother goddess of the village. She is invoked when the village partakes in a ceremony, from seasonal rites to prayers against disasters.
 Thakur Dev, the male guardian of the village.
 Hulera-Pen, the protector of cattle.
 Maitya-Pen, the demon of whirlwinds.
 Narayan-Pen, the sun god.
 Kodapen, the horse god.
 Maswasi Pen, the hunting god.
 Kanya, the water spirits.

Classification
They are a designated Scheduled Tribe in Andhra Pradesh, parts of Uttar Pradesh, Bihar, Chhattisgarh, Gujarat, Jharkhand, Madhya Pradesh, Maharashtra, Telangana, Odisha, and West Bengal.

The Government of Uttar Pradesh had classified the Gondi people as a Scheduled Caste but by 2007, they were one of several groups that the Uttar Pradesh government had redesignated as Scheduled Tribes. As of 2017, that tribal designation applies only to certain districts, not the entire state. The 2011 Census of India for Uttar Pradesh showed the Scheduled Caste Gond population as 21,992.

Genetics
According to genetic study on the Indian population in 2009, Gondi people of Madhya Pradesh carry around 62.5% of halpogroup H, 18.75% Haplogroup R1a, 6.25% Haplogroup K, 6.25% Haplogroup O, 6.25% Haplogroup Q. While Gonds of south Uttar Pradesh had around 59.46% of halpogroup H, 18.92% Haplogroup J, 10.81% Haplogroup K, 8.11% Haplogroup O, 2.7% Haplogroup N.

In popular culture

Gondi people have been portrayed in Rajkummar Rao starrer movie Newton (film) and S.S. Rajamouli Magnum Opus RRR (film), in which the character Komaram Bheem portrayed by N. T. Rama Rao Jr is a Gondi leader. In Amitabh Bachchan jhund(film) rinku rajguru played role of gondi girl, and Skater Girl(film) is actually based on the life of a gond tribal girl Asha Gond

Notable people

Komaram Bheem, freedom fighter
Gunda Dhur
Ramji Gond
Motiravan Kangali, Indian linguist and author
Hriday Shah, King of Garha
Sangram Shah, King of Garha
Baburao Shedmake, Indian tribal freedom fighter
Rani kamlapati, queen of bhopal gond dynasty 
Bakht Buland shah
Bhajju Shyam, Artist
Jangarh Singh Shyam, artist
Venkat Shyam, Artist
Chakradhar Singh, King of Raigarh State
Veer Narayan Singh
Rani durgavathi 
Veer surendra sai 
Durga Bai Vyom, Artist
Kanaka raju gussadi dancer

See also
 Godha
 Ajanbahu Jatbasha
 Asur people
 Meena Tribe

Footnotes

References

Further reading
 The tribal art of middle India – Verrier Elwin – 1951
 Savaging the Civilized, Verrier Elwin, His Tribals & India – Ramachandra Guha – The University of Chicago Press – 1999
 Beine, David m. 1994. A sociolinguistic survey of the Gondi-speaking communities of central India. M.A. thesis. San Diego State University. 516 p.
 Banerjee, B. G., and Kiran Bhatia. Tribal Demography of Gonds. Delhi: Gian Pub. House, 1988. 
 Elwin, Verrier. Phulmat of the Hills; A Tale of the Gonds. London: J. Murray, 1937.
 Fürer-Haimendorf, Christoph von, and Elizabeth von Fürer-Haimendorf. The Gonds of Andhra Pradesh: Tradition and Change in an Indian Tribe. London: George Allen & Unwin, 1979. 
 Kaufmann, Walter. Songs and Drummings of the Hill Maria, Jhoria Muria and Bastar Muria Gonds. And, the Musical Instruments of the Marias and Murias. 1950.
 Mehta, B. H. Gonds of the Central Indian Highlands: A Study of the Dynamics of Gond Society. New Delhi: Concept, 1984.
 Museum of Mankind, Shelagh Weir, and Hira Lal. The Gonds of Central India; The Material Culture of the Gonds of Chhindwara District, Madhya Pradesh. London: British Museum, 1973. 
 Pagdi, Setumadhava Rao. Among the Gonds of Adilabad. Bombay: Popular Book Depot, 1952.
 Pingle, Urmila, and Christoph von Fürer-Haimendorf. Gonds and Their Neighbours: A Study in Genetic Diversity. Lucknow, India: Ethnographic & Folk Culture Society, 1987.
 Sharma, Anima. Tribe in Transition: A Study of Thakur Gonds. India: Mittal Publications, 2005. 
 Singh, Indrajit. The Gondwana and the Gonds. Lucknow, India: The Universal publishers, 1944.
 Kangalee, Motiram Chhabiram, Paree Kupar Lingo Gondi Punemi Darshan (In Hindi),Publisher ujjvala society Nagpur,2011
 Vatti, Jalpati,Mava sagaa padeeng, in Gondwana sagaa Patrika published (In Hindi) in October 1986

External links

 
 
 
 

This article includes material from the 1995 public domain Library of Congress Country Study on India.

Scheduled Tribes of Andhra Pradesh
Scheduled Tribes of Telangana
Dravidian peoples
Scheduled Tribes of Uttar Pradesh
Scheduled Tribes of Odisha
Hindu ethnic groups
Scheduled Tribes of Chhattisgarh
Scheduled Tribes of Bihar
Scheduled Tribes of Gujarat
Scheduled Tribes of Jharkhand
Scheduled Tribes of Madhya Pradesh
Scheduled Tribes of Maharashtra
Scheduled Tribes of West Bengal
Schools of Indian painting
Scheduled Castes of Uttar Pradesh
Hindu communities
Ethnic groups in India
Ethnic groups in South Asia